Dick Bentley Productions Ltd v Harold Smith (Motors) Ltd [1965] EWCA Civ 2 is an English contract law case, concerning the difference between a representation and a contract term.

Facts
Dick Bentley Productions Ltd wanted a ‘well vetted’ Bentley. Harold Smith (Motors) Ltd, car dealers, found one which they said had done only 20,000 miles since a replacement engine. It later emerged that the Bentley had done 100,000 since the engine and gear box had been replaced. Dick Bentley sued Harold Smith for breach of warranty, and was successful before the trial judge.

Judgment
The Court of Appeal held that the statement of how many miles were done was a term of the contract, because the Harold Smith (Motors) Ltd were car dealers and in a better position to know than the claimant about the truth of the statement. This affects the parties' intention to incorporate a term into a contract. Lord Denning MR said the following.

Salmon LJ and Danckwerts LJ agreed.

See also

English contract law

Notes

References

English contract case law
Lord Denning cases
Court of Appeal (England and Wales) cases
1965 in case law
1965 in British law